Nyeri High School, also known as Nyeri High, is a boys boarding school situated in Nyeri, Kenya near Mathari Consolata Mission Hospital, which provides secondary education as stipulated by the 8-4-4 Curriculum. Despite being acknowledged as an academic giant in the region, the school has also developed a notoriety for student unrest culminating in the death of four school prefects in a fire caused by student arson and followed a few years later by a student strike that led to an official government inquiry into the running of the school.

In 2006, Nyeri High School was ranked 22nd best high school in Kenya based on Kenya Certificate of Secondary Education results.

History
The present Nyeri High school was founded in 1907 as a primary school together with the neighbouring St. Paul Seminary and the Mathari Mission Hospital by the Consolata Missionary Sisters on a parcel of land acquired from a local chief a few years earlier. In the 1930s the school began offering K.A.P.E certificates and by the time Kenya gained its political independence  in 1963, had developed into a full high school offering both O-Level and A-Level certificates.

Notable alumni

 Nderitu Gachagua, 1st governor of Nyeri County
 Bonaya Godana, former Member of Parliament for North Horr, 
 Eng. Michael Kamau, former Minister for Roads and Transport
 Joseph Kamotho, former Member of Parliament for Mathioya and Former Minister of Education
 Julius Waweru Karangi, former head of Kenya Defence Forces (KDF)
 Mwai Kibaki, former President of the Republic of Kenya, Member of Parliament, Othaya Constituency
 Musikari Kombo, nominated Member of Parliament
 John  Michuki, Minister for Environment, Republic of Kenya, Member of Parliament, Kangema Constituency
 Francis Muthaura, Former secretary to the cabinet & head of public service in Kenya 
 Dr. Chris Murungaru, former Minister for Internal Security & MP for Kieni Constituency
 Benson Wairegi, former CEO of Britain Insurance Group
 Koigi wa Wamwere, former Member of parliament for Nakuru North (formerly Subukia)

Joseph Gethenji - former MP Tetu constituency
Mwangi Githaiga, CEO & MD KWFT Bank 
Amb. Isaiya Kaberia, Kenya's High commissioner to Australia
Ngata Kariuki, former MP Kerugoya Central & CEO Sarova Group of Hotels
Godfrey Kiruhi, proprietor, Outspan Hospital, Nyeri
Andrew Karuga Maina,  Managing Director, Histoto Ltd
James Kigwa Maina, current school principal
Reagan Orina Momanyi, President Student Union of Egerton University 2018. Politician from Nyamira County.
Gitonga Muchiri 
Charles Mutua Mulwa, Lecturer, Kenyatta University
Babu Muraya, Country Manager, Tuk Tuk Media
Karega Mutahi, Permanent Secretary, Ministry of Local Government
Kijana Steve Maina Nderi, Party Leader, Empowerment and Liberation Party, ELP. 
Peter Ndiang'ui, Country Manager, OLX
James Wagema Ruitha, Managing Director, National Housing Corporation (NHC)
Ngunjiri Martin Deric Wambugu, current Member of Parliament (MP), Nyeri Town

References

External links
Nyeri High School Website

High schools and secondary schools in Kenya
Boys' schools in Kenya 
Boarding schools in Kenya
Education in Central Province (Kenya)